Frisbee is an Italian TV channel marketed towards a children audience of 4 to 14-year-olds, owned by Warner Bros. Discovery EMEA, a division of Warner Bros. Discovery.

History
Frisbee was launched by Switchover Media on 12 June 2010. The channel was marketed at a male audience as a "Channel of Heroes".

After Switchover was acquired by Discovery Communications, On 30 June 2013 the channel rebranded in order to target a female audience and switched its aspect ratio to 16:9.

On 30 April 2015 the channel rebranded again and changed its focus to a general 4–14 year old audience.

Programs
During the beginning of the channel's existence (2011–2013), almost all the programs featured were ex-Jetix shows acquired from Disney-ABC International Television which meant for the first few years, the channel would not need to acquire any new programming. By 2011, the channel began to air reruns of sitcoms, alongside the addition of more modern programming as well.

The current schedule currently focuses on the preschool demographic, featuring shows such as Curious George. Until mid-2019 there was a FRISBEEMINI block which aired shows aimed at preschoolers, however it was removed due to the channel shifting exclusively to that demographic. During the night/graveyard slots it airs programs present on its sister channel K2, such as Oggy And The Cockroaches alongside shows from Discovery like Cake Boss.

Current
 A Kind of Magic
 Cake Boss
 Curious George
 FloopaLoo, Where Are You?
 Gallina Puntolina
 Holiday Baking Championship
 Little People
 Oggy and the Cockroaches
 OOglies
 Paprika
 Ranger Rob
 Super Monsters
 Trolls: The Beat Goes On!
 Trolls: TrollsTopia
 True and the Rainbow Kingdom
 Yoko

Former
 Doki
 Filly Funtasia
 Hubert and Takako
 Julius Jr.
 Kikoriki
 Little Charmers
 Luna Petunia
 Littlest Pet Shop
 Pretty Rhythm
 Rainbow Ruby
 Rat-A-Tat
 Sammy and Company
 Sgt. Frog
 Shopkins
 Space Goofs
 Tickety Toc
 Zack and Quack

2010–2013 Programming additions 
 Babar and the Adventures of Badou (Babar e le avventure di Badou)
 Big Bad Beetleborgs (Beetleborgs - Quando si scatena il vento dell'avventura)
 Braceface (Sorriso d'argento)
 Captain Flamingo (Capitan Flamingo)
 The Cosby Show (I Robinson)
 Diff'rent Strokes (Il mio amico Arnold)
 The Fairly OddParents (Due fantagenitori)
 Family Ties (Casa Keaton)
 Hamtaro
 The Jeffersons (I Jefferson)
 Me and My Monsters (3 mostri in famiglia)
 Michel Vaillant (MIchel Valillant - Tute, caschi e velocità)
 Mirmo!
 Mr. Bean
 Mr. Young (Professor Young)
 My Babysitter's a Vampire (La mia babysitter è un vampiro)
 The New Addams Family (La Nuova Famiglia Addams)
 NPS: No puede ser (Non può essere!)
 Pucca
 Really Me (Miss Reality)
 Sabrina's Secret Life (Sabrina)
 Sgt. Frog (Keroro)
 Stoked (Stoked - Surfisti per caso)
 Sweet Valley High
 Total Drama Island (A tutto reality: L'isola)
 Tree Fu Tom
 Tutenstein
 Wipeout (Wipeout - Pronti a tutto!)
 W.I.T.C.H.

Launch programming
 Action Man (New Action Man)
 Adventures of Sonic the Hedgehog (Le avventure di Sonic)
 The Super Mario Bros. Super Show! (Le avventure di Super Mario)
 Bad Dog
 Big Wolf on Campus (Un lupo mannaro americano a scuola)
 Dragon Booster
 Go! Go! Itsutsugo Land (5 gemelli diversi)
 Goosebumps (Piccoli brividi)
 Iznogoud (Chi la fa, l'aspetti! - Iznogoud)
 Jim Button (Jim Bottone)
 Little Mouse on the Prairie (Tiritere e ghirigori per due topi in mezzo ai fiori)
 Mad Jack the Pirate (Mad Jack)
 MegaMan NT Warrior
 Monster Jam
 My Parents Are Aliens (Papà e mamma sono alieni)
 NASCAR Racers
 Ninja Turtles: The Next Mutation (Tartarughe Ninja: l'avventura continua)
 Spider-Man and His Amazing Friends (L'Uomo Ragno e i suoi fantastici amici)
 Power Rangers
 Power Rangers Lightspeed Rescue
 Power Rangers Time Force
 Power Rangers Wild Force
 RoboRoach
 Saban's Adventures of Oliver Twist (Oliver Twist)
 Saban's Around the World in Eighty Dreams (80 sogni per viaggiare)
 Sophie & Virginia (Sophie e Vivianne - Due sorelle e un'avventura)
 Transformers: Armada
 VR Troopers
 Walter Melon (Walter eroe a tempo perso)
 What's With Andy? (Andy il re degli scherzi)
 The Why Why Family (La famiglia dei perché)
 Wunschpunsch
 X-Men

Notes

Children's television networks
Television channels in Italy
Italian-language television stations
Former subsidiaries of The Walt Disney Company
Television channels and stations established in 2010
Warner Bros. Discovery EMEA